The East Memorial Building and West Memorial Building are a pair of government buildings in Ottawa, Ontario, Canada.

History
Construction started in 1949 to house the rapidly growing Department of Veterans Affairs. The buildings were thus originally named the Veterans Memorial Buildings. They were designed by George Roper Gouinlock (son of architect George Wallace Gouinlock) and H.L. Allward and appears to be a stripped down Art Deco style.

The National Capital Commission (NCC) in collaboration with Public Works and Government Services Canada erected a  historical plaque: 
A memorial is dedicated to the memory of 1701 Men of the Canadian Bank of Commerce who served in the Great War.
The buildings are located on the south side of Wellington Street, across the street from the Supreme Court of Canada Building. Lyon Street passes between the two buildings, but they are linked by the Memorial Arch. Between the two lanes of Lyon Street are gardens and a large stone relief carved by Ivan Meštrović to honour those who fought in the Second World War.

In the early 1980s, as part of Prime Minister Pierre Elliot Trudeau's plans to decentralize the federal government, Veterans Affairs' headquarters moved out of the East Memorial Building and into the Daniel J. MacDonald Building in Charlottetown, Prince Edward Island. Other departments have since moved in. Today the Department of Justice is headquartered in the East Building. Currently, West Memorial Building is vacant and in poor condition with plans for major renovations in the near future. 1
Some offices for the National Archives were also located in these buildings.

Renovations
The West Memorial Building will be renovated from 2019-2023 to restore it to a usable condition. From 2023-2028 it will house the Supreme Court of Canada, Federal Court of Appeal, and the Federal Court.

External links 
Veterans Affairs page on the buildings

References

Federal government buildings in Ottawa
Art Deco architecture in Canada